Song of Warsaw (Finnish: Varsovan laulu) is a 1953 Finnish crime film directed by Matti Kassila and starring Matti Oravisto, Åke Lindman and Christina Paischeff. The film is based around a smuggling plot, and was filmed in Helsinki and Hamburg.

Cast
 Matti Oravisto as First Officer  
 Åke Lindman as Captain  
 Christina Paischeff as Ilse  
 Leo Riuttu as Inspector Ahmavirta 
 Hannes Veivo as Voitto Jalmari Bister  
 Kauko Laurikainen as Lauri Elias Koskinen  
 Kullervo Kalske as Detective Komppa  
 Matti Aulos as Detective Kymäläinen  
 Aarne Laine as Owner of Pasilan romu  
 Pentti Viljanen as Cook  
 Eino Kaipainen as Captain Lieutenant Koivusalo  
 Uljas Kandolin as Sea Guard Lahtinen 
 Pentti Siimes as Sea Guard  
 Tommi Rinne as Sea Guard  
 Heimo Lepistö as Worker  
 Pentti Irjala as Pentti  
 Keijo Komppa as Guard  
 Armas Jokio as Man in Hamburg

References

Bibliography 
 Qvist, Per Olov & von Bagh, Peter. Guide to the Cinema of Sweden and Finland. Greenwood Publishing Group, 2000.

External links 
 

1953 films
1953 crime drama films
Finnish crime drama films
1950s Finnish-language films
Films directed by Matti Kassila
Films set in Helsinki
Films set in Hamburg
Finnish black-and-white films